Nošovice is a municipality and village in Frýdek-Místek District in the Moravian-Silesian Region of the Czech Republic. It has about 1,000 inhabitants.

Etymology
The name originates from lokator Potmienoss, who settled with his people in a desolate place between the villages Nižní Lhoty and Dobrá and founded the settlement. Later the leading Potmie part of the name was dropped.

Geography
Nošovice lies in the historical region of Cieszyn Silesia, in the Moravian-Silesian Foothills. The village is located on the right bank of the Morávka River. The area between the river and the village is protected as a national nature monument Skalická Morávka.

History
The first written mention of Nošovice (as Potmienossowicze or Potměnošovice) is from 1573, when it a part of the Friedeck state country and the country was split from the Duchy of Teschen, however settlement of the village and deforestation began around 1447. Politically the Friedeck state country was a part of the Kingdom of Bohemia. The name of Nošovice was used for the first time in 1664, when it was a village with about 220 inhabitants.

Nošovice was traditionally an agricultural village. Linen was also woven here and in the early 19th century there was a factory for military bottles.

After World War I and fall of Austria-Hungary it became a part of Czechoslovakia. In March 1939 it became a part of Protectorate of Bohemia and Moravia. After World War II it was restored to Czechoslovakia.

Economy

The factory of the Hyundai Motor Company was built here in 2006. The branch known as Hyundai Motor Manufacturing Czech is one of the main employers in the region.

Nošovice is also known for agriculture and the food and beverage industry. The Radegast brewery is located here, and the local agricultural cooperative focuses on the production of milk, pork, potatoes and sauerkraut. Nošovice Sauerkraut has been a protected designation of origin since 2010.

Sights
Nošovice is poor in monuments. There is a memorial of fallen in the World Wars, three small chapels, a calvary and a stone cross.

References

External links

 

Villages in Frýdek-Místek District
Cieszyn Silesia